The present coat of arms of or national seal of Guinea was adopted in 1993.

Features 
The Guinean coat of arms features a dove with a golden olive branch in its beak over a ribbon with "Work justice solidarity". The arms formerly also included a crossed sword and rifle. A former coat of arms in 1958 features a red and green shield with a yellow elephant on it.

History

References

External links
 Coat of arms of Guinea in the Flags of the World website.

National symbols of Guinea
Guinea
Guinea
Guinea
Guinea